Michael Hicks (born 17 June 1983 in Nashville, Tennessee) is an American-Polish professional international basketball player, also specialising in the 3x3 format. 

Having settled permanently and married in the country, he represented Poland in the 2019 3x3 World Cup in Amsterdam winning top scorer and the bronze medal, and at the 2020 Olympics in Tokyo.

References

Polish men's basketball players
1983 births
Living people
Naturalized citizens of Poland
Basketball players from Nashville, Tennessee
3x3 basketball players at the 2020 Summer Olympics
Olympic 3x3 basketball players of Poland
Polish men's 3x3 basketball players